The National Center for Hydrology and Meteorology is the National Meteorological service of the Kingdom of Bhutan.

History
The Center was established in January 2016 as per the recommendation of the Organization Development (OD) exercises carried out by the Royal Civil Service Commission (RCSC) in August 2014 to provide scientific and technical information and services related to weather, climate, cryosphere, meteorology, hydrology and water resources for line agencies and public.

References

External links
 NCHM homepage

Governmental meteorological agencies in Asia
2016 establishments in Bhutan